Cuban-born American singer and songwriter Camila Cabello has recorded songs for two studio albums, one live album, single droplets and guest features. Her debut single as a solo artist was her collaboration with Shawn Mendes, "I Know What You Did Last Summer," released in November 2015, Cabello again released a collaborative single, "Bad Things," with Machine Gun Kelly in 2016, which was Cabello's first top 5 hit song on Billboard Hot 100. Before launching her debut album in 2017, Cabello also appeared as a featured artist on "Love Incredible" from Cashmere Cat's album 9, Pitbull and J Balvin's The Fate of the Furious soundtrack single "Hey Ma", and Lin-Manuel Miranda's charity single "Almost Like Praying," and contributed the song "Crown" to the Bright soundtrack (2017) in collaboration with music producer duo Grey. She also released the stand-alone single "Crying in the Club" along with the promotional single "I Have Questions."

Cabello's debut studio album Camila, released in January 2018, spawning three singles "Havana", "Never Be the Same", and "Consequences." She collaborated with other artist, including Young Thug, to create the pop album. Cabello appeared as a featured artist on Bazzi's song "Beautiful" (2018) during her first headlining tour Never Be the Same Tour (2018). Cabello performed a debut live performance on American Music Awards of 2018, for her single "Consequences" from her debut album and won four American Music Awards including New Artist of the Year. The debut album was nominated for Best Pop Vocal Album at the 61st Annual Grammy Awards. Cabello also performed her Grammy-nominated single "Havana" on 61st Annual Grammy Awards.

Before her second album cycle, Cabello firstly co-wrote and released the Latin Grammy Award for Record of the Year winning song "Mi Persona Favorita", which serves as the third single on Alejandro Sanz' twelfth studio album El Disco (2019). Then, Cabello appeared as a guest on the Kevin Parker co-wrote song "Find U Again" from Mark Ronson's studio album Late Night Feelings and the Ed Sheeran song "South of the Border" featuring Cabello and Cardi B. Cabello's sophomore studio album included the Shawn Mendes collaborative single "Señorita," "Liar," "Shameless," "Cry for Me," "Easy," and "My Oh My" featuring American rapper DaBaby. Cabello performed an album cut "First Man" as a tribute to her father instead of her then charting single "My Oh My."

Cabello then co-wrote her original song "Million to One" with Scott Harris, which appears on the soundtrack of her big screen debut Cinderella. She also participated in the cover recording of "Perfect" by Ed Sheeran, "Rhythm Nation" by Janet Jackson, "You Gotta Be" by Des'ree, "Could Have Been Me" by the Struts, and the Gloria Estefan written classic "Let's Get Loud" by Jennifer Lopez.

Songs

Unreleased songs

See also
 Camila Cabello discography

References

Notes
Notes for other versions

Notes for covers

Notes for band members

Citations

External links
Camila Cabello discography on AllMusic

Cabello, Camila